In matrix theory, the Frobenius covariants of a square matrix   are special polynomials of it, namely  projection  matrices Ai associated with the eigenvalues and eigenvectors of  . They are named after the mathematician Ferdinand Frobenius.

Each covariant is a projection  on the eigenspace associated with the eigenvalue .
Frobenius covariants are the coefficients of Sylvester's formula, which expresses a function of a matrix  as a matrix polynomial, namely a linear combination 

Formal definition
Let  be a diagonalizable matrix with eigenvalues λ1, …, λk.

The Frobenius covariant , for i = 1,…, k, is the matrix

It is essentially the Lagrange polynomial with matrix argument. If the eigenvalue  λi is simple, then as an idempotent projection matrix to a one-dimensional subspace,   has a unit trace.

Computing the covariants

Then .

If  has an eigenvalue λi appearing multiple times, then , where the sum is over all rows and columns associated with the eigenvalue λi.

Example

Consider the two-by-two matrix:

This matrix has two eigenvalues, 5 and −2; hence .

The corresponding eigen decomposition is

Hence the Frobenius covariants, manifestly projections,  are 

with

Note , as required.

References

Matrix theory